The Lycée Français d'Alexandrie is a French international school in Chatby, Alexandria, Egypt. The Mission Laïque Française operates the school, which  has 530 students. It serves ages 3 to 18, until the lycée (sixth form/senior high school) level.

References

External links

  Lycée Français d'Alexandrie

International schools in Egypt
Schools in Alexandria
French international schools in Egypt
Private schools in Alexandria
International schools in Alexandria
Educational institutions established in 1909
1900s establishments in Egypt